National Capital Park and Planning Commission may refer to

 Maryland-National Capital Park and Planning Commission
 National Capital Planning Commission, formerly known by this name from 1926 to 1952 and previously as the National Capital Park Commission